Chilliwack is a city made up of several amalgamated villages and communities.  The urban core has a decidedly north–south axis bisected by the Trans-Canada Highway. The city is bounded in north by the Fraser River, in the east by the Eastern Hillsides, in the south by the Canada-U.S. border, and in the west by the Vedder Canal.

North side

North side, also referred to as Chilliwack Proper Village West, covers the area from the Trans-Canada Highway in the south, to the Fraser River in the north, and includes the following communities.

Camp River

A picturesque, rural farming community at the North-East extreme of the city on Fairfield Island.

Cheam

Downtown Chilliwack

Also known as Chilliwack Proper, is the historical urban centre of the city. Several cultural attractions, such as the Prospera Centre, Chilliwack Cultural Centre and the new “District 1881” are located there, as well as key government buildings, such as City Hall, FVRD offices, and the Provincial Court of British Columbia.
The Eagle Landing Shopping Center is located southwest of downtown, between Chilliwack and Sardis.

East Chilliwack

A rural-suburban community located between Downtown Chillwack to the west, and Rosedale to the east.

Fairfield Island

A mainly suburban and residential neighborhood, and the northernmost community within the city boundaries.

Rosedale

A rural-suburban community in the north-eastern part of the city.

South side

Atchelitz

Chilliwack River Valley

Stretching 47 km from Chilliwack Lake to the Vedder Crossing, the valley contains an eclectic mix of homes, vacation properties, campgrounds, industry (logging/mining), and Crown Land. It is increasingly popular as an outdoor recreation destination, featuring hiking, camping, fishing, whitewater sports, off-road motoring, and birding.

Columbia Valley

Cultus Lake Park

Greendale

Popkum (Not considered part of Chilliwack but part of the Fraser Valley)

At the eastern extreme of the city limits, and a popular tourist destination and way station for travelers on the Trans-Canada Highway. Attractions include Bridal Veil Falls and The Falls Golf and Country Club.

Promontory

Ryder Lake

Sardis

Sardis is the urban core of the south side and a popular shopping destination.

Vedder Crossing

A vibrant and burgeoning community on the north bank of the Vedder River, home to the Canada Education Park and the Twin Rinks ice hockey arena.

Yarrow

The village was first settled by Mennonites in the late 1920s, following the draining of Sumas Lake and the reclamation of the former lake bed for agriculture. It is at the foot of the Skagit Range of the Cascade Mountains on the Vedder River, near the latter's confluence with the Fraser, which traverses the Lower Mainland, of British Columbia. The Lower Mainland Ecoregion is part of the Pacific Maritime Ecozone. The village of Yarrow lies between Vedder Mountain to the south and Sumas Mountain to the northwest. The climate is temperate with most of the precipitation falling in the winter months as rain. The summer is warm and relatively dry. The fertile upper Fraser Valley supports the growth of many varieties of fruit, vegetables and herbs. Yarrow's economy is thus primarily agricultural and includes dairy farms and field crops (blueberries, corn, cole crops and hay).

References